The 1932 Idaho Vandals football team represented the University of Idaho in the 1932 college football season. The Vandals were led by fourth-year head coach Leo Calland, and were members of the Pacific Coast Conference. Two home games were played on campus in Moscow at MacLean Field, with one in Boise at Public School Field.

Idaho compiled a  overall record and lost all but one of its five games in the PCC. The Vandals were led on the field by undersized junior quarterback Wee Willie Smith, then known as "Little Giant" Willis Smith  Two years later in 1934, he was a backup in the NFL with the New York Giants in their championship season.

Idaho played a night game in Los Angeles against UCLA on Friday, September 30; rain caused light attendance and a  It was part of a Palouse–Los Angeles doubleheader in the Memorial Coliseum that weekend; USC hosted Washington State on Saturday afternoon. The stadium was the prime venue of the Summer Olympics less than two months earlier.

In the Battle of the Palouse with neighbor Washington State, the Vandals suffered a fifth straight loss, falling  at Rogers Field in Pullman on  Idaho's most recent win in the series was seven years earlier in 1925 and the next was 22 years away in 1954. For fans from Spokane, a special Northern Pacific train transported fans to Pullman; the round trip fare was two dollars.

Schedule

 The Little Brown Stein trophy for the Montana game debuted six years later in 1938
 One game was played on Friday (at UCLA in Los Angeles at night)and one was played on Thursday (in Boise against Utah State on Thanksgiving)

All-conference
No Vandals were named to the All-Coast teams (Associated Press); junior quarterback Willis Smith was an NEA second team selection.

References

External links
Gem of the Mountains: 1933 University of Idaho yearbook – 1932 football season
Go Mighty Vandals – 1932 football season
Official game program: Idaho at Washington State –  November 5, 1932
Idaho Argonaut – student newspaper – 1932 editions

Idaho
Idaho Vandals football seasons
Idaho Vandals football